Hume's principle or HP says that the number of Fs is equal to the number of Gs if and only if there is a one-to-one correspondence (a bijection) between the Fs and the Gs. HP can be stated formally in systems of second-order logic. Hume's principle is named for the Scottish philosopher David Hume and was coined by George Boolos.

HP plays a central role in Gottlob Frege's philosophy of mathematics. Frege shows that HP and suitable definitions of arithmetical notions entail all axioms of what we now call second-order arithmetic. This result is known as Frege's theorem, which is the foundation for a philosophy of mathematics known as neo-logicism.

Origins 
Hume's principle appears in Frege's Foundations of Arithmetic (§63), which quotes from Part III of Book I of David Hume's A Treatise of Human Nature (1740). Hume there sets out seven fundamental relations between ideas. Concerning one of these, proportion in quantity or number, Hume argues that our reasoning about proportion in quantity, as represented by geometry, can never achieve "perfect precision and exactness", since its principles are derived from sense-appearance. He contrasts this with reasoning about number or arithmetic, in which such a precision can be attained:

Algebra and arithmetic [are] the only sciences in which we can carry on a chain of reasoning to any degree of intricacy, and yet preserve a perfect exactness and certainty. We are possessed of a precise standard, by which we can judge of the equality and proportion of numbers; and according as they correspond or not to that standard, we determine their relations, without any possibility of error. When two numbers are so combined, as that the one has always a unit answering to every unit of the other, we pronounce them equal; and it is for want of such a standard of equality in [spatial] extension, that geometry can scarce be esteemed a perfect and infallible science. (I. III. I.)

Note Hume's use of the word number in the ancient sense, to mean a set or collection of things rather than the common modern notion of "positive integer". The ancient Greek notion of number (arithmos) is of a finite plurality composed of units. See Aristotle, Metaphysics, 1020a14 and Euclid, Elements, Book VII, Definition 1 and 2. The contrast between the old and modern conception of number is discussed in detail in Mayberry (2000).

Influence on set theory 
The principle that cardinal number was to be characterized in terms of one-to-one correspondence had previously been used by Georg Cantor, whose writings Frege knew. The suggestion has therefore been made that Hume's principle ought better be called "Cantor's Principle" or "The Hume-Cantor Principle". But Frege criticized Cantor on the ground that Cantor defines cardinal numbers in terms of ordinal numbers, whereas Frege wanted to give a characterization of cardinals that was independent of the ordinals. Cantor's point of view, however, is the one embedded in contemporary theories of transfinite numbers, as developed in axiomatic set theory.

References

External links 
 Stanford Encyclopedia of Philosophy: "Frege's Logic, Theorem, and Foundations for Arithmetic" by Edward Zalta.
 "The Logical and Metaphysical Foundations of Classical Mathematics."
 Arche: The Centre for Philosophy of Logic, Language, Mathematics and Mind at St. Andrew's University.

Set theory
Philosophy of mathematics
Mathematical principles
Concepts in logic